Gulph Creek is a tributary of the Schuylkill River in southeastern Pennsylvania.  It is approximately six miles long and flows in an easterly direction. It passes through Tredyffrin, Radnor, and Upper Merion Townships, and the borough of West Conshohocken.   It also passes through the village of Gulph Mills and goes past Hanging Rock alongside Route 320. Gulph Creek originates at an elevation of 410 feet in Strafford and is named after the over 200 foot deep "gulph" the creek flows through after taking an abrupt turn north after flowing in a east-northeast direction.

It is one of four watersheds in Radnor Township, the others being, Ithan Creek, Darby Creek, and Meadowbrook Run

History
The Gulph Creek valley has attracted the interest of historians due to George Washington and his troops having camped in the immediate area in December 1777 during his journey to Valley Forge.

References

External links
 Gulph Creek stormwater management

Rivers of Delaware County, Pennsylvania